The Thieving Hand is a 1908 American silent short film. It is credited for its astounding trick photography and effects for its age.

The film was shot on location in Flatbush, Brooklyn, New York City and released on February 1, 1908 in the United States.

It is one of the 50 films in the 4-disc boxed DVD set called Treasures from American Film Archives (2000), compiled by the National Film Preservation Foundation from 18 American film archives. The film's print is preserved by the George Eastman House.

In November 2008, it was shown in Leeds Film Festival, as part of Back to the Electric Palace, with live music by Sasha Siem, performed in partnership with Opera North.

Plot

A one-armed beggar receives a new limb from a strange store that specializes in human appendages. The new arm has a mind of its own, though, and brings the man nothing but trouble.

References

External links

1908 films
American black-and-white films
American silent short films
Films directed by J. Stuart Blackton
Films shot in New York City
Vitagraph Studios short films
Articles containing video clips
1908 comedy films
1900s fantasy comedy films
American fantasy comedy films
1900s American films
Silent American comedy films